Oleg Gennadyevich Sizov (born 11 June 1963, in Kuybyshev) is a former Russian football player and coach.

References

1963 births
Sportspeople from Samara, Russia
Living people
Soviet footballers
FC Uralets Nizhny Tagil players
FC Tekstilshchik Kamyshin players
FC Rotor Volgograd players
Russian footballers
Russian Premier League players
Russian football managers

Association football midfielders